Roussolakkos is the site of a Minoan city, located near Palekastro, Crete. The Bronze Age town was occupied from Early Minoan IIA to Late Minoan IIIB, and its remains are relatively well preserved. A later Greek temple to Diktaian Zeus was built at the nearby Elaea promontory.

In Greek mythology, the site was regarded as the birthplace of Diktaian Zeus. and the location where Jason and the Argonauts confronted Talos, the man of bronze, a generation before the Trojan War.

Bronze age settlement 

The earliest written records documenting the worship of Diktaian Zeus at Roussolakkos come from the Mycenaean Greek Linear B archives at Knossos and date to the close of the Cretan Bronze Age (ca. 1300 BC), however, sacred art and architecture dating from all periods have been found, suggesting that the site was hallowed throughout its history. Among the most beautiful artifacts attesting the worship of Diktaian Zeus is a unique gold and ivory statuette of the god made ca. 1500 BC. See this and more finds at the museum in Sitia.

Archaeology 
Roussolakkos was first excavated from 1902-6 by Robert Carr Bosanquet and Richard MacGillivray Dawkins of the British School at Athens. Work was continued by L. H. Sackett and M. R. Popham in 1962-3, and is currently directed by J. A. MacGillivray, L. H. Sackett and J. M. Driessen since 1983.

Just south of Roussolakkos is Mt Petsophas, a peak sanctuary likely to have been linked with the town. Linear A inscriptions on offering tables from Petsophas are designated as PK for Palaikastro by Godart and Olivier.

The Palaikastro Kouros was found at Roussolakkos, purposefully desecrated by burning and smashing during an ancient invasion of the site.

Endangered site 

While the ravages of later periods and recent tourism development have obscured similar sites elsewhere in Crete, so far they have spared Roussolakkos with an area of 50,000 square metres. Today, however, a private developer has been granted permission to build a large tourist complex at Cape Plako, an area which includes the Minoan quarries and outlying sites. An access road to reach the resort area is planned through the ancient city. In addition to development pressures, Palekastro's harbor and coastal buildings are also threatened by a rise in sea level due to local tectonic activity.

References 

Populated places established in the 2nd millennium BC
1902 archaeological discoveries
Lasithi
Minoan sites in Crete
Populated places in ancient Greece
Former populated places in Greece
Jason